Mary Tyler Moore (December 29, 1936 – January 25, 2017) was an American actress, known for her roles in the television sitcoms The Mary Tyler Moore Show (1970–77), in which she starred as Mary Richards, a thirtyish single woman who worked as a local news producer in Minneapolis, and  The Dick Van Dyke Show (1961–66), in which she played Laura Petrie, a former dancer turned Westchester homemaker, wife and mother. Her notable film work includes 1967's Thoroughly Modern Millie and 1980's Ordinary People, in which she played a role that was very different from the television characters she had portrayed, and for which she was nominated for an Academy Award for Best Actress.

Television

Filmography

Awards

References

Actress filmographies
American filmographies
Lists of awards received by American actor